Hunter is an unincorporated community in Boone County, Illinois, United States. Hunter is northwest of Poplar Grove and north of Timberlane.

References

Unincorporated communities in Boone County, Illinois
Unincorporated communities in Illinois